Sidney Easton (October 2, 1885December 24, 1971) was an African-American actor, stage performer, playwright, composer, vocalist, and pianist. He worked as a performer in minstrel shows, carnivals, burlesque, and vaudeville. Starting in the 1930s he appeared in films.

Biography 
Sidney Easton was born on October 2, 1885, in Savannah, Georgia. However some sources have his date of birth as 1886 or 1891. Easton was the eldest of six children, his parents were Eva and King Easton. In childhood, Easton went to work for the John Robinson Circus and later with the A.G. Allan Minstrel Show. He was married to performer Sarah Dooley from 1913 to 1920, ending in her death.

Easton was a member of the Easton Trio. Many of his songs were recorded by various musicians in the 1920s including , Margaret Johnson, Martha Copeland, Fats Waller, Fess Williams and his Royal Flush Orchestra, Ethel Waters and the Ebony Four, George Bias, Stewart Wille, Virginia Liston, Clarence Williams and the Clarence Williams’ Blue Five, and Eva Taylor.

Easton had a few successful collaborations with the singer Ethel Waters, including the lyrics and composition of the song, Go Back to Where You Stayed Last Night. Easton was the lyric and instrumental composer and served as a co- producer alongside Joe Simms of the traveling show, Sons of Rest (1920).

In the 1940s he sued 20th Century Fox the makers of the film, Lifeboat (1944) for having used his play Lifeboat 13 to write the script. The case settled out of court four years later.

The New York Public Library's Schomburg Center for Research in Black Culture has a collection of his papers.

Theater and stage

Filmography

References

External links 

 

19th-century births
1971 deaths
Musicians from Savannah, Georgia
Blackface minstrel performers
American dramatists and playwrights
African-American male actors